Eupithecia spissilineata is a moth in the family Geometridae. It is found in the southern Alps of France, as well as Italy, Bosnia and Herzegovina, North Macedonia, Greece, Bulgaria, Romania and Ukraine.

The wingspan is about 17 mm.

References

Moths described in 1846
spissilineata
Moths of Europe